Vokal may refer to:

 The Vermont Organization of Koha Automated Libraries, a unified library catalog used by over fifty libraries in Vermont
 Vokal (fashion brand)